The 1994 Liège–Bastogne–Liège was the 80th edition of the Liège–Bastogne–Liège cycle race and was held on 17 April 1994. The race started in Liège and finished in Ans. The race was won by Evgeni Berzin of the Gewiss–Ballan team.

General classification

References

1994
1994 in Belgian sport
Liege-Bastogne-Liege
April 1994 sports events in Europe
1994 in road cycling